La Plaine is an off-island suburb of Montreal, and a formerly incorporated town in southwestern Quebec, Canada. It lies north of Montreal and Laval. It is now part of the city of Terrebonne in the Les Moulins Regional County Municipality. It is part of the administrative division of Lanaudière.

History
The city of La Plaine was founded in 1830 on fragments of other cities, namely Mascouche, Sainte-Anne-des-Plaines, Saint-Lin–Laurentides and Terrebonne. At that time, the lords of Terrebonne and Lachenaie were building the road named "chemin de la Grande Ligne" to join the two cities. It is now called Laurier Boulevard. In 1877, the rail system was developed and stimulated the economic growth. The village of Saint-Joachim was founded during that time, which was later, in 1920, to be renamed La Plaine.

Population
At the time of the merger in 2001, the population of La Plaine was 15,673.

Recreation 
The Forum de La Plaine is a 2,000-seat multi-purpose arena.

Education
The Commission scolaire des Affluents operates the following French public schools in this area:
École primaire de l'Orée-des-Bois
École primaire du Boisé
École primaire Saint-Joachim
École primaire du geai-bleux
École secondaire de l'Odyssée

Sir Wilfrid Laurier School Board operates Anglophone public schools:
 Pinewood Elementary School in Mascouche
 Rosemere High School in Rosemère

References

External links
History of La Plaine and other sectors of Terrebonne (in French)
 The Canadian Encyclopedia

Former municipalities in Quebec
Communities in Lanaudière
Terrebonne, Quebec
Populated places disestablished in 2001